Pejman Dorostkar (born 18 August 1976 in Tehran) is an Iranian wrestling coach. He was formerly a wrestler. He competed at the 2000 Summer Olympics in Sydney, in the men's freestyle 76 kg. He won two gold medals at the 2001 and 2003 Asian Championships.

Wrestling accomplishments
1992 World Junior Bronze Medalist Turkey
1999 US World Cup bronze medalist
World Student Gold Medal Winner 2004 Poland
Wrestler in the 2003 Bundesliga, 2003, 2004, 2005

Wrestling coaching records
In 2013, the head coach of Samen Al-Hajjaj team, the champion of the Iranian Wrestling Premier League
In 2017, the head coach of the Iranian team for the deaf won the Turkish Deaf Olympics
In 2018, the head coach of the Iranian deaf team, the world deaf champion of Russia
In 2018, the head coach of Iranmal, the champion of the Iranian Wrestling Premier League
In 2019, the head coach of Iranmal, the champion of the Iranian Wrestling Premier League
In 2019, the head coach of Iranmal, the world champion club of Iran
In 2019, Head coach of the Iranian national youth freestyle wrestling team
In 2021, Head coach of the Iran national freestyle wrestling team.

At the 2021 World Wrestling Championships, the Iranian national freestyle wrestling team led by Pejman Dorostkar won three gold, three silver and one bronze medal with 163 points.

References

External links

1976 births
Living people
20th-century Iranian people
21st-century Iranian people
Asian Games competitors for Iran
Iranian male sport wrestlers
Iranian sports coaches
Olympic wrestlers of Iran
Wrestlers at the 2000 Summer Olympics
Wrestlers at the 1998 Asian Games
Wrestlers at the 2002 Asian Games
Wrestling coaches